A carbon budget is "the maximum amount of cumulative net global anthropogenic carbon dioxide emissions that would result in limiting global warming to a given level with a given probability, taking into account the effect of other anthropogenic climate forcers". When expressed relative to the pre-industrial period it is referred to as the Total Carbon Budget, and when expressed from a recent specified date it is referred to as the Remaining Carbon Budget.

A carbon budget consistent with keeping warming below a specified limit is also referred to as an emissions budget, an emissions quota, or allowable emissions. An emissions budget may also be associated with objectives for other related climate variables, such as radiative forcing or sea level rise.

Total or remaining carbon budgets are calculated by combining estimates of various contributing factors, including scientific evidence and value judgments or choices.

Global carbon budgets can be further divided into national emissions budgets, so that countries can set specific climate mitigation goals. Emissions budgets are relevant to climate change mitigation because they indicate a finite amount of carbon dioxide that can be emitted over time, before resulting in dangerous levels of global warming. Change in global temperature is independent from the geographic location of these emissions, and is largely independent of the timing of these emissions.

Carbon budgets are applicable to the global level. To translate these global carbon budgets to the country level, a set of value judgments have to be made on how to distribute the total and remaining carbon budget. This involves the consideration of aspects of equity and fairness between countries as well as other methodological choices. There are many differences between nations, including but not limited to population, level of industrialisation, national emissions histories, and mitigation capabilities. For this reason, scientists have made attempts to allocate global carbon budgets among countries using methods that follow various principles of equity. 

An emissions budget may be distinguished from an emissions target, as an emissions target may be internationally or nationally set in accordance with objectives other than a specific global temperature and are commonly applied to the annual emissions in a single year as well.

Estimations

Recent and currently remaining carbon budget

Several organisations provide annual updates to the remaining carbon budget, including the Global Carbon Project, the Mercator Research Institute on Global Commons and Climate Change (MCC) and the CONSTRAIN project.
In March 2022, before formal publication of the 'Global Carbon Budget 2021' preprint, scientists reported, based on Carbon Monitor (CM) data, that after COVID-19-pandemic-caused record-level declines in 2020, global  emissions rebounded sharply by 4.8% in 2021, indicating that at the current trajectory, the carbon budget for a ⅔ likelihood for limiting warming to 1.5 °C would be used up within 9.5 years.

In April 2022, the now reviewed and officially published The Global Carbon Budget 2021 concluded that fossil  emissions rebounded from pandemic levels by around +4.8% relative to 2020 emissions – returning to 2019 levels.

It identifies three major issues for improving reliable accuracy of monitoring, shows that China and India surpassed 2019 levels (by 5.7% and 3.2%) while the EU and the US stayed beneath 2019 levels (by 5.3% and 4.5%), quantifies various changes and trends, for the first time provides models' estimates that are linked to the official country GHG inventories reporting, and suggests that the remaining carbon budget at 1. Jan 2022 for a 50% likelihood to limit global warming to 1.5°C (albeit a temporary exceedence is to be expected) is 120 GtC (420 Gt) – or 11 years of 2021 emissions levels.

This does not mean that likely 11 years remain to cut emissions but that if emissions stayed the same, instead of increasing like in 2021, 11 years of constant GHG emissions would be left in the hypothetical scenario that all emissions suddenly ceased in the 12th year. (The 50% likelihood may be describable as a kind of minimum plausible deniability requirement as lower likelihoods would make the 1.5°C goal "unlikely".) Moreover, other trackers show (or highlight) different amounts of carbon budget left, such as the MCC, which as of May 2022 shows '7 years 1 month left' and different likelihoods have different carbon budgets: a 83% likelihood would mean 6.6 ±0.1 years left (ending in 2028) according to CM data.

Carbon budget in gigatonnes and factors 

The finding of an almost linear relationship between global temperature rise and cumulative carbon dioxide emissions has encouraged the estimation of global emissions budgets in order to remain below dangerous levels of warming.

Scientific estimations of the remaining global emissions budgets/quotas differ due to varied methodological approaches, and considerations of thresholds. Estimations might not include all amplifying climate change feedbacks, although the most authoritative carbon budget assessments by the IPCC do account explicitly for these. The IPCC assesses the size of remaining carbon budgets using estimates of past warming caused by human activities, the amount of warming per cumulative unit of CO2 emissions (also known as the Transient Climate Response to cumulative Emissions of carbon dioxide, or TCRE), the amount of warming that could still occur once all emissions of CO2 are halted (known as the Zero Emissions Commitment), and the impact of Earth system feedbacks that would otherwise not be covered; and vary according to the global temperature target that is chosen, the probability of staying below that target, and the emission of other non- greenhouse gases (GHGs). This approach was first applied in the 2018 Special report on Global Warming of 1.5°C by the IPCC, and was also used in its 2021 Working Group I Contribution to the Sixth Assessment Report.

Carbon budget estimates depend on the likelihood or probability of avoiding a temperature limit, and the assumed warming that is projected to be caused by non- emissions. The values for the carbon budget estimates in the following table are drawn from the latest assessment of the Physical Science Basis of climate change by the Working Group I Contribution to the IPCC Sixth Assessment Report. These estimates assume non- emissions are also reduced in line with deep decarbonisation scenarios that reach global net zero  emissions. Carbon budget estimates thus depend on how successful society is in reducing non- emissions together with carbon dioxide emissions. The IPCC Sixth Assessment Report estimated that remaining carbon budgets can be 220 Gt  higher or lower depending on how successful non- emissions are reduced.  

1 GtC (carbon) = 3.66 GtCO2

Carbon dioxide removal

In order to keep global emissions within a carbon budget, global  emissions need to decline to net zero. The Intergovernmental Panel on Climate Change (IPCC) Sixth Assessment Report (AR6) highlights that the deployment of carbon dioxide removal (CDR) measures is unavoidable if net zero  emissions are to be achieved. These CDR measures are required to counterbalance hard-to-abate residual emissions. The IPCC assessment further highlights that "the scale and timing of deployment will depend on the trajectories of gross emission reductions in different sectors".
 
CDR can fulfil "thee different complementary roles" according to the IPCC, always in addition to "deep, rapid, and sustained emission reductions": First, CDR can lower net  or net greenhouse gas emissions in the near-term; second, it can counterbalance residual emissions from sectors for which currently no other reduction measures have been identified or for which these are considered too expensive or difficult to implement (e.g., emissions from agriculture, aviation, shipping, industrial processes) in order to help reach net zero   or net zero greenhouse emissions in the mid-term; and third, CDR can be used to achieve net negative  or greenhouse gas emissions in the long-term, if deployed at levels exceeding annual residual emissions.

National emissions budgets 

Carbon budgets are applicable to the global level. To translate these global carbon budgets to the country level, a set of value judgments have to be made on how to distribute the total and remaining carbon budget. In light of the many differences between nations, including but not limited to population, level of industrialisation, national emissions histories, and mitigation capabilities, scientists have made attempts to allocate global carbon budgets among countries using methods that follow various principles of equity. Allocating national emissions budgets is comparable to sharing the effort to reduce global emissions, underlined by some assumptions of state-level responsibility of climate change. Many authors have conducted quantitative analyses which allocate emissions budgets, often simultaneously addressing disparities in historical GHG emissions between nations. 

One guiding principle that is used to allocate global emissions budgets to nations is the principle of "common but differentiated responsibilities and respective capabilities" that is included in the United Nations Framework Convention on Climate Change (UNFCCC). This principle is not defined in further detail in the UNFCCC but is broadly understood to recognize nations' different cumulative historical contributions to global emissions as well as their different development stages. From this perspective, those countries with greater emissions during a set time period (for example, since the pre-industrial era to the present) are the most responsible for addressing excess emissions, as are countries that are richer. Thus, their national emissions budgets have to be smaller than those from countries that have polluted less in the past, or are poorer. The concept of national historical responsibility for climate change has prevailed in the literature since the early 1990s and has been part of the key international agreements on climate change (UNFCCC, the Kyoto Protocol and the Paris Agreement). Consequently, those countries with the highest cumulative historical emissions have the most responsibility to take the strongest actions and help developing countries to mitigate their emissions and adapt to climate change. This principle is recognized in international treaties and has been part of the diplomatic strategies by developing countries, that argue that they need larger emissions budgets to reduce inequity and achieve sustainable development.

Another common equity principle for calculating national emissions budgets is the "egalitarian" principle. This principle stipulates individuals should have equal rights, and therefore emissions budgets should be distributed proportionally according to state populations. Some scientists have thus reasoned the use of national per-capita emissions in national emissions budget calculations. This principle may be favoured by nations with larger or rapidly growing populations, but raises the question whether individuals can have a right to pollute. 

A third equity principle that has been employed in national budget calculations considers national sovereignty. The "sovereignty" principle highlights the equal right of nations to pollute. The grandfathering method for calculating national emissions budgets uses this principle. Grandfathering allocates these budgets proportionally according to emissions at a particular base year, and has been used under international regimes such as the Kyoto Protocol and the early phase of the European Union Emissions Trading Scheme (EU ETS) This principle is often favoured by developed countries, as it allocates larger emissions budgets to them. However, recent publications highlight that grandfathering is unsupported as an equity principle as it "creates 'cascading biases' against poorer states, is not a 'standard of equity'". Other scholars have highlighted that "to treat states as the owners of emission rights has morally problematic consequences".

See also
Global Carbon Project

References

External links
The CONSTRAIN Project Annual Report 

Greenhouse gas emissions
Environmental science
Climate change mitigation